The linguistics wars were a protracted academic dispute inside American theoretical linguistics which took place mostly in the 1960s and 1970s, stemming from an intellectual falling out between Noam Chomsky and some of his early colleagues and doctoral students. The debate began in 1967, when linguists Paul Postal, "Haj" Ross, George Lakoff, and James McCawley—self-dubbed the "Four Horsemen of the Apocalypse" (in reference to the Book of Revelation)—proposed an approach to the relationship between syntax and semantics which treated deep structures as meanings rather than syntactic objects. While Chomsky and other generative grammarians argued that the meaning of a sentence was derived from its syntax, the generative semanticists argued that syntax was derived from meaning.

Eventually, generative semantics spawned an alternative linguistic paradigm, known as cognitive linguistics, which attempts to correlate the understanding of language with the concepts of cognitive psychology, such as memory, perception and categorization. While generative grammarians operate on the premise that the mind has a unique and independent module for language acquisition, cognitive linguists deny this. Instead, they assert that the processing of linguistic phenomena is informed by conceptual deep structures and—more significantly—that the cognitive abilities used to process this data are similar to those used in other non-linguistic tasks.

Books 
The Linguistics Wars is the title of a 1993 book by Randy Allen Harris which closely chronicles the dispute among Chomsky and other significant individuals (Lakoff, Postal, etc.) and also highlights how certain theories evolved and which of their important features have influenced modern-day linguistic theories. A second edition was published in 2022, in which Harris traces several important 21st century linguistic developments (Construction Grammar, Frame Semantics, and Cognitive Linguistics) out of late generative semantics. The second edition also argues that Chomsky's Minimalist Program has significant homologies with early generative semantics.

Ideology and Linguistic Theory, by John A. Goldsmith and Geoffrey J. Huck, also explores that history, with detailed theoretical discussion and observed history of the times, including memoirs/interviews with Ray Jackendoff, George Lakoff, Paul M. Postal, and John R. Ross.  The "What happened to Generative Semantics" chapter explores the aftermath of the "wars" and the schools of thought or practice which could be seen as successors to generative semantics.

See also
 Ray C. Dougherty
 Ray Jackendoff
 Neurolinguistics
 Decoding Chomsky: Science and revolutionary politics

References

Generative linguistics
Syntax
Semantics
Linguistic controversies
Noam Chomsky